Beat Kennel is an album by the Rova Saxophone Quartet recorded in Milan in 1987 for the Italian Black Saint label.

Reception 

The Allmusic review by Scott Yanow states "ROVA perfectly balances advanced arranged sections with dynamic individual and group improvising on this consistently stimulating set ... The results reward repeated listenings by open-minded avant-garde collectors".

Track listing 
 "El Amor en los Tiempos de la Finca" (Andrew Voigt) – 7:50
 "The Aggregate" (Jon Raskin) – 10:05
 "Sportspeak" (Voigt, Raskin, Larry Ochs, Bruce Ackley) – 5:07
 "Composition 37" (Anthony Braxton) – 5:39
 "What Was Lost Regained" (Raskin) – 10:53

Personnel 
Bruce Ackley – soprano saxophone
Andrew Voigt – alto saxophone and sopranino saxophone on "What Was Lost Regained"
Larry Ochs – tenor saxophone
Jon Raskin – baritone saxophone and lead alto saxophone on "The Aggregate"

References 

Black Saint/Soul Note albums
Rova Saxophone Quartet albums
1987 albums